The University of Missouri-St. Louis Police Department (UMSL PD) is the law enforcement agency of the University of Missouri-St. Louis, a public research university located just outside the city of St. Louis, Missouri.

The University of Missouri-St. Louis Police Department is the 18th university in the country and the 5th Land Grant Institution Police Department to achieve CALEA's first credentialing program: the Law Enforcement Accreditation Program. (CALEA).

Police officers appointed by the University of Missouri System have the same power and authority held by peace officers of the state of Missouri. The agency's primary jurisdiction is UMSL property, which includes both the North and South campus, as well as other UMSL-owned or controlled properties.

USML police officers also have jurisdiction throughout the state of Missouri.

History
In 1965, Police Chief James J. Nelson became the first Police Chief for the University of Missouri-St. Louis. Chief Nelson served with distinction from 1965 to 1981.

In 1982, Chief William Karabas became the second Police Chief for the University's Police Department. Chief Karabas served with distinction from 1982 - 1987.

The agency has been accredited by the Commission on Accreditation for Law Enforcement Agencies since 2000.

Organization

Department Structure
UMSL PD operates the following department bureaus: 
 Bureau of Police Operations
 Patrol
 Lost and Found 
 Bike Patrol
 Records
 Bureau of Special Operations
 Detective and Investigative Section
 Crime Prevention and Community Involvement Section
 Bureau of Standards and Technology
 Communications

Parking & Transportation
The Parking & Transportation Division of Institutional Safety is located in the main office of the campus police building.

Commissioned/sworn positions

UMSL PD uses the following ranks:

See also
 St. Louis County Police Department
 University of Missouri Police Department

References

External links
 University of Missouri-St. Louis Police Department

School police departments of Missouri
Missouri-St. Louis 
University of Missouri–St. Louis
1963 establishments in Missouri
Educational institutions established in 1963